Kenn Church, Kenn Pier & Yew Tree Farm SSSI is a 15.37 hectare geological Site of Special Scientific Interest near the village of Kenn, Somerset, notified in 1997.

The site is listed in the Geological Conservation Review because it consists of a complex sequence of Pleistocene sediments, including coarse glacial outwash gravels at the base overlain by a complex sequence of interglacial freshwater, estuarine and marine sands. The sequence is then capped by aeolian (windblown) coversands and Holocene silts.

References

External links
 English Nature (SSSI Information)

Sites of Special Scientific Interest in North Somerset
Sites of Special Scientific Interest notified in 1997